Zelia is a genus of bristle flies in the family Tachinidae.

Species

Zelia argentosa (Reinhard, 1946)
Zelia discalis (Townsend, 1919)
Zelia formosa Dios & Santis, 2019
Zelia gracilis (Reinhard, 1946)
Zelia guimaraesi Dios & Santis, 2019
Zelia limbata (Wiedemann, 1830)
Zelia magna Dios & Santis, 2019
Zelia metalis (Reinhard, 1946)
Zelia mira (Reinhard, 1946)
Zelia montana (Townsend, 1919)
Zelia nitens (Reinhard, 1946)
Zelia peruviana (Brèthes, 1920)
Zelia picta (Bigot, 1889)
Zelia plumosa (Wiedemann, 1830)
Zelia potens (Wiedemann, 1830)
Zelia ruficauda (Reinhard, 1946)
Zelia rufina (Bigot, 1885)
Zelia semirufa (Wulp, 1891)
Zelia spectabilis (Wulp, 1891)
Zelia tricolor (Coquillett, 1899)
Zelia vertebrata (Say, 1829)
Zelia wildermuthii Walton, 1914
Zelia zonata (Coquillett, 1895)

References

Dexiinae
Tachinidae genera
Taxa named by Jean-Baptiste Robineau-Desvoidy
Diptera of North America
Diptera of South America